The Gatineau City Council is the governing body for the mayor–council government in the city of Gatineau, Quebec, Canada. It is composed of 20 city councillors and the mayor. The mayor is elected at large, while each of the councillors represent districts throughout the city. Council members are elected to four year terms with the last election being the 2021 election.

Members (2021-2025)
See 2021 Gatineau municipal election

Members (2017-2021)
See 2017 Gatineau municipal election

Members (2013-2017)
See 2013 Gatineau municipal election

Members (2009-2013)
See: 2009 Gatineau municipal election

 Marc Bureau - Mayor
 Stefan Psenak - District 1, Aylmer District
 André Laframboise - District 2, Lucerne District
 Alain Riel - District 3, Deschênes District
 Maxime Tremblay - District 4, Plateau–Manoir-des-Trembles District
 Patrice Martin - District 5, Wright–Parc-de-la-Montagne District
 Mireille Apollon - District 6, Orée-du-Parc District
 Pierre Philion - District 7, Saint-Raymond–Vanier District
 Denise Laferrière - District 8, Hull–Val-Tétreau District
 Nicole Champagne - District 9,  Limbour District
 Denis Tassé - District 10, Touraine District
 Luc Angers - District 11, Promenades District
 Patsy Bouthillette - District 12, Carrefour-de-l'Hôpital District
 Joseph De Sylva - District 13, Versant District
 Sylvie Goneau - District 14, Bellevue District
 Stéphane Lauzon - District 15, Lac-Beauchamp District
 Yvon Boucher - District 16, Rivière-Blanche District
 Luc Montreuil - District 17, Masson-Angers District
 Maxime Pedneaud-Jobin - District 18, Buckingham District

Members (2005-2009)
 Marc Bureau - Mayor
 Frank Thérien - District 1, Aylmer District
 André Laframboise - District 2, Lucerne District
 Alain Riel - District 3, Deschênes District
 Alain Pilon - District 4, Val-Tétreau District
 Patrice Martin - District 5, Wright–Parc-de-la-Montagne District
 Louise Poirier (until 2008) then Claude Millette - District 6, Orée-du-Parc District
 Pierre Philion - District 7, Saint-Raymond–Vanier District
 Denise Laferrière - District 8, Hull District
 Simon Racine - District 9,  Limbour District
 Denis Tassé - District 10, Riverains District
 Luc Angers - District 11, Promenades District
 Joseph De Sylva - District 12, Versant District
 Richard Côté - District 13, Bellevue District
 Aurèle Desjardins - District 14, Lac-Beauchamp District
 Yvon Boucher - District 15, Rivière-Blanche District
 Luc Montreuil - District 16, Masson-Angers District
 Jocelyne Houle - District 17, Buckingham District

Former members

 Yves Ducharme, Mayor, (2001–2005), defeated in last election
 André Levac - District 1, District of Aylmer (2001–2005), defeated in last elections
 Alain Labonté - District 2, District of Lucerne (2001–2005), did not run in 2005
 André Touchet - District 3, District of Deschênes (2001–2003), deceased in 2003
 Richard Jennings - District 3, District of Deschênes (2003–2005), did not run in 2005
 Lawrence Cannon - District 4, District of Val-Tétreau (2001–2005), run successfully in federal election in 2006
 Thérèse Cyr - District 10, District of Riverains (2001–2005), retired - did not run in 2005
 Paul Morin - District 11, District of Promenades (2001–2005), defeated in last election

Members (1999-2001)
(Pre-amalgamated city of Gatineau)

 Robert Labine, Mayor 
 Jean-Guy Binet, Limbour District
 Thérèse Cyr, De Touraine District
 Marcel Schryer, Du Ruisseau District
 Richard Canuel, Le Baron District
 Joseph de Sylva, District 5
 Jacques-R. Forget, District 6
 Paul Morin, De la Baie District
 Pierre Durand, Des Pionniers District
 Aurèle Desjardins, Du Moulin District
 Richard Côté, Bellevue District
 Jean-Pierre Charette, Des Belles-Rives District
 Yvon Boucher, De la Rivière-Blanche District

References

External links
 Gatineau City Council

Municipal councils in Quebec
Politics of Gatineau